Donnell Gilliam (March 12, 1889 – March 6, 1960) was a United States district judge of the United States District Court for the Eastern District of North Carolina.

Education and career

Born in Tarboro, North Carolina, Gilliam received a Bachelor of Arts degree from the University of North Carolina at Chapel Hill in 1909 and a Bachelor of Laws from the University of North Carolina School of Law in 1910. He was in private practice in Tarboro from 1923 to 1945, also serving as a North Carolina district solicitor from 1923 to 1945.

Federal judicial service

On May 3, 1945, Gilliam was nominated by President Harry S. Truman to a seat on the United States District Court for the Eastern District of North Carolina vacated by Judge Isaac Melson Meekins. Gilliam was confirmed by the United States Senate on May 15, 1945, and received his commission on May 18, 1945. He assumed senior status on March 16, 1959, serving in that capacity until his death on March 6, 1960, in Tarboro.

References

Sources
 

1889 births
1960 deaths
People from Tarboro, North Carolina
North Carolina lawyers
University of North Carolina School of Law alumni
Judges of the United States District Court for the Eastern District of North Carolina
United States district court judges appointed by Harry S. Truman
20th-century American judges